Sashikumar Cheliah (born 10 June 1979) is a Singaporean-born Australian cook. He was a contestant on the tenth series of MasterChef Australia in 2018, eventually winning the show.

Early life 
Cheliah was born and raised in Singapore where he attended Swiss Cottage Secondary School and ITE College, Yishun. He is the eldest of seven children.

For 12 years, Cheliah worked for the Special Tactics and Rescue (STAR) unit of the Singapore Police Force (SPF), where he trained in tactics, rescue operations, counter terrorism, kidnappings and high-profile protection in the riot police.

Cheliah is married to Rabicca Vijayan, who works as a nurse. They have two sons. The family moved to Adelaide in 2012.

Cheliah's interest in food began by watching his mother, who owned a café, and his aunties prepare family meals. His interest in cooking grew further after he moved to Australia. His goal is to open a fusion restaurant featuring Indian and South Asian flavours.

MasterChef Australia 
Cheliah was selected in the Top 24 to contest MasterChef Australia in 2018. He reached the finale on 31 July, which he won with a record 93 points out of 100.

In 2022, Cheliah returned to compete on the show's fourteenth season, which featured a mix of returning contestants and new contenders. He finished in 19th place

After MasterChef 
Cheliah started a pop-up restaurant named Gaja by Sashi in the Melbourne CBD, serving Singaporean dishes.

In November 2019, Cheliah opened his restaurant Gaja in his home town of Adelaide.

In 2020, Cheliah's son, Ryan participated in the third season of Junior MasterChef Australia but was eliminated in the first elimination challenge.

References

External links

Living people
Participants in Australian reality television series
Reality cooking competition winners
MasterChef Australia
People from Singapore
People from Adelaide
Singaporean emigrants to Australia
Australian people of Singaporean descent
Australian people of Indian descent
Australian television chefs
Singaporean police officers
1979 births